Kevin Lygo (born 18 September 1957) is a British television executive, presently Director of Television at ITV.

Early life

Lygo is the son of Royal Navy officer Raymond Lygo. Educated at Cranbrook School, Kent, Lygo studied Psychology at Durham University, graduating in 1980. After leaving university in 1980 one of his first jobs was at the Half-Price Theatre Ticket Booth in Leicester Square, operated by the Society of West End Theatre.

Career

After August 1981 he was one of three trainees to join the BBC, alongside Peter Salmon (former BBC head of sport) and multi-award-winning film-maker Peter Kosminsky. After the two years trainee-ship as a comedy script writer, during which he worked on The Two Ronnies, Lygo worked freelance including on the launch of Terry Wogan's BBC1 chatshow, Wogan.

Lygo then left the television industry for seven years, part of which he spent in France as a dealer in Islamic art, with a gallery in Paris. Persuaded by friend Richard Curtis to produce Comic Relief, he came back on a six-month contract with the BBC. He then rejoined the BBC on a permanent contract, commissioning shows including Men Behaving Badly and They Think It's All Over.

Hired in 1997 by Channel 4, Lygo was Channel 4's Head of Entertainment between 1998 and 2001, where he commissioned TFI Friday, Smack the Pony, So Graham Norton, Trigger Happy TV and Spaced. After spending two years at Five on its launch, he returned to Channel 4 in 2003 as Director of Television and Content. In this role he commissioned Big Brother, Sugar Rush and The F Word, and poached Richard and Judy.

He then spent 2010-2016 as managing director at ITV Studios, before becoming the director of television for the ITV Network.

References

External links
Profile at Media Guardian

Living people
1957 births
Alumni of St Cuthbert's Society, Durham
British television executives
Channel 4 people
People educated at Cranbrook School, Kent